Nathaniel Terry Jr. (January 30, 1768 – June 14, 1844) was a United States Representative from Connecticut.  He was born in Enfield, Connecticut. He attended the common schools, Dartmouth College, and was graduated from Yale College in 1786. He studied law and was admitted to the bar in 1790 and commenced practice in Enfield. He moved to Hartford, Connecticut in 1796.

Terry served as commander of the Governor's Foot Guard of Hartford 1802–1813; and as a judge of the Hartford County Court from 1807 to 1809, when he resigned. He was a member of the Connecticut State House of Representatives 1804–1815. He was elected as a Federalist to the Fifteenth Congress (March 4, 1817 - March 3, 1819). He was a member of the Connecticut State Constitutional Convention in 1818. He served as president of the Hartford Fire Insurance Company 1810-1835 and president of the Hartford Bank 1819–1828. He was the Mayor of Hartford, Connecticut 1824-1831 and also served as a General in the State militia. He died in New Haven, Connecticut in 1844 and was buried in Old North (Spring Grove) Cemetery, Hartford, Connecticut.

References

External links
 

1768 births
1844 deaths
People from Enfield, Connecticut
Yale College alumni
Mayors of Hartford, Connecticut
American militia generals
Federalist Party members of the United States House of Representatives from Connecticut
Burials in Connecticut